MLC Building may refer to:

MLC Building, North Sydney (1957), by Bates, Smart, McCutcheon
MLC Building, Sydney (1938), on Martin Place by Bates, Smart, McCutcheon
25 Martin Place (1977), on Martin Place by Harry Seidler named the MLC Centre until 2021
MLC Tower (1998), in Wan Chai, Hong Kong, by Andrew Lee King Fun & Associates
Mutual Life & Citizens Assurance Company Building (1940), in Wellington, New Zealand, by Mitchell and Mitchell

See also
MLC Limited, the Australian insurance company responsible for the construction of all of the above
MLC (disambiguation)

Architectural disambiguation pages